Beaufort National Cemetery is a United States National Cemetery located in Beaufort County, in the city of Beaufort, South Carolina. Managed by the United States Department of Veterans Affairs, it encompasses , and as of 2014, had over 19,000 interments.

History 

The original interments in the cemetery were men who died in nearby Union hospitals during the occupation of the area early in the Civil War, mainly in 1861, following the Battle of Port Royal. Battlefield casualties from around the area were also reinterred in the cemetery, including over 100 Confederate soldiers. It became a National Cemetery with the National Cemetery Act by Abraham Lincoln in 1863.

Of the Civil War soldiers buried here, there are: 9,000 Union soldiers (4,400 unknown,) 2,800 POWs from the camp at Millen and 1,700 African-American union soldiers. There are also 177 confederate soldiers. The remains of 27 Union prisoners of war were reinterred from Blackshear Prison following the war.

Beaufort National Cemetery now has interments from every major American conflict, including the Spanish–American War, the Korean War, the Vietnam War, and the Gulf War.

In 1987, the remains of nineteen Union soldiers of the all black Massachusetts 55th Volunteer Infantry were discovered on Folly Island, South Carolina. The Folly North Archaeological Project, 1990 did further excavations in the area after Hurricane Hugo revealed artifacts due to erosion of the soil and due to concerns of future erosion in the area. The Items discovered included leather shoes, rubberized canvas, wood staves and animal bone.

The Massachusetts 55th had been stationed on Folly Island from late 1863 to early 1864 and was a sister unit to the better-known Massachusetts 54th Volunteer Infantry, featured in the film Glory.

On May 29, 1989, the 54th soldiers along with the body of Robert Gould Shaw were reinterred in the Beaufort National Cemetery with full military honors.  Cast members from the film served as the honor guard at the ceremony.

Beaufort National Cemetery was listed on the National Register of Historic Places in 1997.

Notable interments 

 Medal of Honor recipients
 Private First Class Ralph H. Johnson (1949–1968), recipient for action in the Vietnam War.
 Captain John J. McGinty III (1940–2014), recipient for action in the Vietnam War
 Others
 Colonel Donald Conroy (1921–1998), known as The Great Santini.
 John N. McLaughlin (1918–2002), Marine Corps Lieutenant General, served in three wars and spent three years as P.O.W.
 Master Sergeant Joseph Simmons, Légion d'honneur recipient, Buffalo Soldier, World War I and World War II veteran.
 General Edwin Pollock (1899–1982)
 Colonel Robert Gould Shaw (1837–1863), commander of the African-American 54th Massachusetts Regiment, subject of the movie Glory.
 Chuck Taliano (1945–2010), USMC drill instructor featured in the "We don’t promise you a rose garden" recruitment poster during the 1970s and 1980s.
 General William G. Thrash (1916–2011) 
 Major General Reuben Henry Tucker III (1911–1970), Commandant of Cadets, The Citadel  1963–68.

 US Army General James Grimsley (1921–2013)
 William Pinckney (1915–1976), recipient of the Navy Cross. 
 Major General Charles Spragins

 Ian Ronald Atherton Adamson, Lieutenant of Royal Navy, only one of Commonwealth war dead in World War II.

References

External links 

 National Cemetery Administration
 Beaufort National Cemetery
 
 
 
 
 CWGC: Beaufort National Cemetery

Cemeteries on the National Register of Historic Places in South Carolina
Protected areas of Beaufort County, South Carolina
United States national cemeteries
South Carolina in the American Civil War
Historic American Landscapes Survey in South Carolina
National Register of Historic Places in Beaufort County, South Carolina
Beaufort, South Carolina
Commonwealth War Graves Commission cemeteries in the United States